Slow Disco may refer to:

 "Slow Disco" (song) on the Masseduction album
 Silent disco